Sikaritai (Sikwari) is a Lakes Plain language of Papua, Indonesia. It is named after Sikari village in Rafaer District, Mamberamo Raya Regency. Alternate names are Aikwakai, Araikurioko, Ati, Tori, Tori Aikwakai.

It is spoken in Haya, Iri, and Sikari villages.

Sikaritai, Obokuitai, and Eritai constitute a dialect cluster.

Phonology 
The following discussion is based on Martin (1991).

Consonants 

This small consonant inventory is typical of Lakes Plain languages. The complete lack of nasals is also a feature of these languages.

There are however several notable allophonic variants:
 /d/ is realized as  word-initially,  between vowels or following another consonants, and as  syllable-finally.
 /k/ is realized as  syllable-finally. When followed by a vowel, the sequence /ik/ is realized as a syllabic fricative .
  is in free variation with a glottal fricative .
 /s/ is realized as  following /k/.
 /i/ before another vowel is realized as either a semivowel  or an affricate  (the latter when following /k/ or when between two low vowels ( or ).

Vowels 
Sikaritai has six vowels.

Many other Lakes Plain languages have developed a series of extra high "fricativized" vowels from the loss of a final consonant. In Sikaritai the final consonants have been retained; however, extra-high [i] and [u] appear as allophones of /i/ and /u/ before final /g/ and /d/. Martin postulates that Sikaritai is in the process of developing contrastive fricativized vowels as other Lakes Plain languages have done.

Tone 
The language has a two-height tone system with H and L tone. More than one tonal element can appear on a single syllable.

Syllables 
The syllable template is (C)(C)V(V)(C).

References

Central Lakes Plain languages
Languages of western New Guinea